Romain Sans (born 19 March 1999) is a French professional footballer who plays as a defender for  club Concarneau on loan from Châteauroux.

Club career
Sans made his professional debut with Sochaux in a 1–0 Ligue 2 win over FC Lorient on 22 December 2018.

On 17 June 2021, he joined Châteauroux for the term of two seasons. On 31 January 2023, Sans was loaned to Concarneau.

References

External links
 
 

1999 births
People from Foix
Sportspeople from Ariège (department)
Footballers from Occitania (administrative region)
Living people
French footballers
Association football fullbacks
FC Sochaux-Montbéliard players
LB Châteauroux players
US Concarneau players
Ligue 2 players
Championnat National players
Championnat National 3 players